The Serranía de Ronda is a comarca in the western part of the province of Málaga, Andalusia, Spain. As is currently (as of 2009) the norm in Andalusia, it has no formal status. The 2007 Statute of Autonomy of Andalusia, unlike its 1981 predecessor, mentions comarcas in Article 97 of Title III, which defines the significance of comarcas and establishes a basis for formal recognition in future legislation, but no such legislation has yet been enacted.

Geography 
It is an area of natural beauty and geographical diversity, popular with walkers, birdwatchers, climbers and potholers. It contains both the Sierra de Grazalema Natural Park - reputedly one of the wettest regions in Spain - and the Sierra de las Nieves. The central town of Ronda is the administrative headquarters, perched on a high plateau, with numerous small, white villages dotted around the surrounding countryside.

There are limestone escarpments, cork forests and fields of wheat and sunflowers. Numerous small rivers cross the landscape. The climate is generally dry and hot in summer, with mild spring and autumn seasons. Winters can be very cold, particularly at night, and snow is not uncommon at the higher altitudes. Cloudless days in winter can be warm and bright, and the light is considered to be good for photography and painting.

Ornithologists value this area as a major migration route and some rare species can be seen.

Municipalities 

According to the Provincial Deputation of Málaga, the comarca consists of the following municipalities:
 Algatocín
 Alpandeire
 Arriate
 Atajate
 Benadalid
 Benalauría
 Benaoján
 Benarrabá
 Cartajima
 Cortes de la Frontera
 Faraján
 Gaucín
 Genalguacil
 Igualeja
 Jimera de Líbar
 Jubrique
 Júzcar
 Montejaque
 Parauta
 Pujerra
 Ronda

The Regional Government of Andalusia adds the municipalities of Cuevas del Becerro and El Burgo to this list.

Statistics
Naturally, the basic statistics are slightly different, depending on whether or not Cuevas del Becerro and El Burgo are counted as part of the comarca.

Notes

External links 

 laserrania.net, Editorial La Serranía, Ronda

Comarcas of Andalusia
Geography of the Province of Málaga